Hananoumi Ken  (born 6 December 1960 as Ken Sawaishi) is a former sumo wrestler from Ikawa, Akita, Japan. He made his professional debut in May 1976, and reached the top division in March 1985. His highest rank was komusubi. He retired in July 1989.

Career
He was persuaded by his father, a rice farmer, to be a sumo wrestler, although he really wanted to play baseball. He joined the original Hanakago stable in May 1976, and for five years he was a tsukebito or personal attendant to yokozuna Wajima Hiroshi, until the latter′s retirement in 1981. The two spent much of their spare time tinkering with Wajima′s luxury American automobile, a Lincoln Continental. Sawaishi began competing under his own surname, although he went through a number of different shikona, including Otowadake, Sawakaze and Onoumi, before finally settling on Hananoumi, meaning ′lake or sea of flowers.′

In July 1983 he took the makushita division championship with a perfect 7–0 record and was promoted to the juryo division, becoming a fully fledged sekitori for the first time. He reached the top makuuchi division in March 1985 and just one tournament later won his first sansho or special prize, for Technique. In November 1985 he had his first victory over a yokozuna, earning a kinboshi for defeating tournament winner Chiyonofuji. In March 1987 he beat Chiyonofuji again, scored ten wins at maegashira 1 and won his second Technique Award, and with it promotion to what was to be his highest rank of komusubi. In September 1987 he achieved the feat of winning a majority of wins against losses (kachi-koshi) despite missing four days and having to return for the last seven – the first time this had been done in the top division for 22 years. On the seventh day of the May 1988 tournament he was defeated by Chiyonofuji, the first bout in Chiyonofuji's post-war record winning streak of 53 consecutive matches.

Retirement from sumo
In March 1989 Hananoumi returned to the komusubi rank but had a disastrous tournament, losing his first nine bouts before withdrawing injured on Day 10. In May he defaulted on Day 5 after losing his first four matches due to a herniated disk and was never to appear on the dohyo again, retiring after missing the July 1989 tournament altogether. He remained in sumo for a short time as an elder under the name Hanakago Oyakata (formerly used by his old boss Wajima), but left the Sumo Association in June 1990. He ran a chanko restaurant in Akita and after it closed ran a hotel in Nanporo, Hokkaido.

Fighting style
Hananoumi had an unusual fighting style, preferring to come in low at the tachi-ai and push up against the opponent′s armpits, known as hazu–oshi. He also liked the throat thrust, or nodowa. When fighting on the mawashi he used a double inside grip, or morozashi. His two most common winning kimarite were yorikiri (force out) and oshidashi (push out).

Career record

See also
Glossary of sumo terms
List of past sumo wrestlers
List of komusubi

References

1960 births
Living people
Japanese sumo wrestlers
Sumo people from Akita Prefecture
Komusubi